Wendell Harrison (born October 1, 1942) is an American jazz clarinetist and tenor saxophonist.

Early life and career 

Wendell Harrison was born in Detroit, Michigan.  In Detroit, Harrison began formal jazz studies with pianist Barry Harris.  He began playing clarinet at age seven.  He switched to tenor saxophone while attending Northwestern High School, and at 14, performed professionally for the first time.  In Detroit, early gigs included backing Marvin Gaye as part of Choker Campbell's band.  In 1960, Harrison moved to New York.  He began performing with artists such as Grant Green, Chuck Jackson, Big Maybelle, and Sun Ra.  Along with saxophonist Howard Johnson, and trumpeters Marcus Belgrave and Jimmy Owens, Harrison toured with Hank Crawford and appeared as a sideman on four of Crawford's albums recorded for Atlantic Records during 1965-67.

In the late 1960s, Wendell Harrison relocated to California and entered substance abuse treatment at Synanon center.  During his two-year stay, he collaborated with artists such as Esther Phillips and Art Pepper.  In addition, Harrison and other residents recorded an album under the musical direction of Greg Dykes.  Prince Of Peace was released on Epic Records in 1968.

Tribe 
In 1971, Harrison headed back to Detroit and began teaching music at Metro Arts, a multi-arts complex for youth.  At Metro Arts, Harrison reconnected with Marcus Belgrave, and first met pianist/composer Harold McKinney and trombonist Phil Ranelin, who had moved to Detroit from Indianapolis in 1969.  With Ranelin, Harrison formed the Tribe record label and artist collective.  Tribe used this vehicle to convey a growing black political consciousness. In addition to McKinney and Belgrave, the group also included drummer and composer Doug Hammond, pianist Kenny Cox, trumpeter Charles Moore, pianist David Durrah, and bassist Ron Brooks.

Harrison and his first wife, Patricia, also published Tribe magazine, a publication dedicated to local and national social and political issues, as well as featuring artistic contributions such as poetry and visual pieces.  The magazine proved popular, eventually switching from quarterly to monthly publication.  Harrison supervised the editing of Tribe magazine until the final issue hit the newsstands in 1977.

Rebirth and WenHa 
In 1978, with encouragement from John Sinclair, Harrison and Harold McKinney co-founded Rebirth, Inc.  Run by Harrison's second wife, Pamela Wise, Rebirth is a non-profit jazz performance and education organization, whose mission is to “educate youth and the greater community about jazz through workshop and concert presentations throughout the Midwest”.  Notable jazz artists, such as Geri Allen, Jimmy Owens, James Carter, Eddie Harris, Leon Thomas, and Woody Shaw have participated in Rebirth's programs. Further expanding on his focus on music education, Harrison authored the Be Boppers Method Books I & II as a teaching aid to musicians looking to build their improvisational skills.

During this time, Harrison also created the WenHa record label and publishing company, which released many of his recordings as well as that of other artists, such as Wise, Phil Ranelin, and Doug Hammond.

Return to clarinet 
In the late 1980s, Harrison increased his focus on the clarinet.  He formed the Mama's Licking Stick clarinet ensemble, which features E flat soprano, B flat, alto, bass and contrabass clarinets.  With this ensemble, Harrison recorded several albums: Mama's Licking Stick, Rush and Hustle, Live In Concert, and Forever Duke.  Harrison has continued to bring attention to the jazz clarinet via education workshops, as well as public performances.  He has showcased the clarinet in such varied settings as his own Swing Ensemble (where he occasionally sings) and accompanying techno artist Carl Craig.

Revisiting Tribe and Michigan Jazz Masters 
In the early 1990s, Wendell Harrison was awarded the title of “Jazz Master” by Arts Midwest, a regional organization partnered with the National Endowment For the Arts.  This distinction led Harrison to collaborate with fellow honorees to form the Michigan Jazz Masters group in 1995. Focusing on a more straight-ahead jazz style for this project, Harrison toured with Michigan Jazz Masters throughout the United States, followed by Middle East and African tours.

Harrison's recordings under the Tribe label continued to have a large following in Europe and Asia.  In the early 2000s, this attention led to the reissue of his 1972 release, An Evening With the Devil, as well as most of the Tribe Records catalog.  The ensuing publicity encouraged Harrison to once again feature the tenor sax, working closely again, and touring internationally with, Tribe label mates Phil Ranelin and Marcus Belgrave.  This renewed interest resulted in another collaboration with producer Carl Craig on the 2009 album, Rebirth, which integrates the style of the 1970s Tribe recordings with Craig's modern production values and musical sensibility.  In addition to performing, Harrison is credited with four compositions to the album.

Recent projects 
Wendell Harrison continues to hold the position of artistic director of Rebirth[citation], organizing and executing workshops and residencies in school music programs.  Harrison also continues to perform and record, collaborating on sessions with artists such as Proof, Amp Fiddler, Don Was, and Will Sessions.

Education 
Wendell Harrison earned a Bachelors of Science Degree in 2014 from Spring Arbor University, majoring in Organizational Management.  In 2017 he earned a Masters in Communications Degree, also from Spring Arbor University.

Discography
Albums as Leader:
An Evening with the Devil (Tribe Records, 1972)
A Message From the Tribe with Phil Ranelin (Tribe, 1973)
Dreams of a Love Supreme (Rebirth Records, 1979)
Organic Dream (Rebirth, 1981)
Birth of a Fossil (Rebirth, 1985)
Reawakening (Rebirth, 1985)
Wait Broke the Wagon Down (Rebirth, 1987)
The Carnivorous Lady (Rebirth, 1988)
Fly by Night (WenHa, 1990)
Forever Duke (Wen-Ha, 1991)
Live in Concert (WenHa, 1992)
Something For Pops with Harold McKinney (Wenha, 1993)
Rush & Hustle (WenHa/Enja, 1994)
The Battle of the Tenors (WenHa/Enja, 1998)
Eighth House: Riding with Pluto (Entropy Records, 2002)
Urban Expressions (WenHa, 2004)
It's About Damn Time (Rebirth, 2011)

Appears on:
Hank Crawford - Dig These Blues (Atlantic, 1965)
Hank Crawford - After Hours (Atlantic, 1966)
Hank Crawford - Mr. Blues (Atlantic, 1967)
Hank Crawford - Double Cross (Atlantic, 1967)
Greg Dykes - The Prince Of Peace, 1968
Phil Ranelin - The Time is Now!, 1973
Harold McKinney - Voices and Rhythms of the Creative Profile, 1974
Marcus Belgrave - Gemini II, 1974
Phil Ranelin - Vibes From the Tribe, 1976
William Odell Huges - Cruising, 1982
Michigan Jazz Masters - Urban Griots, 1998
Telefon Tel Aviv - Map of What Is Effortless, 2004
Phil Ranelin - Inspiration, 2004
Slicker - We All Have a Plan, 2004
Proof - Grown Man Shit, 2005
Proof - Searching for Jerry Garcia, 2005
John Arnold - Style and Pattern, 2005
Amp Fiddler - Afro Strut, 2007
Carl Craig - Paris Live, 2007
Tribe - Rebirth, 2009
Sean Blackman - In Transit, 2009
Will Sessions - Kindred, 2010
Doug Hammond Tentet - Rose, 2011
John Lindberg BC3 - Born in an Urban Ruin, 2016

References

External links
[ Wendell Harrison] at Allmusic
Wendell Harrison website

1942 births
Living people
American jazz saxophonists
American male saxophonists
American jazz clarinetists
American male jazz composers
American jazz composers
American magazine publishers (people)
Jazz musicians from Michigan
Musicians from Detroit
Record producers from Michigan
21st-century American saxophonists
21st-century clarinetists
21st-century American male musicians